The 2016 Swope Park Rangers season is the club's inaugural year of existence, and their first season in the Western Conference of the United Soccer League, the third tier of the United States Soccer Pyramid.

Roster 
As of March 25, 2016.

Staff
  Marc Dos Santos – Head Coach
  Nikola Popovic – Assistant Coach
  Alec Dufty – Goalkeeping Coach
  Josh McAllister – Fitness Coach

Competitions

Preseason

USL Regular season

Standings

Matches

References

Swope
Swope
Sporting Kansas City II seasons